The simple station Suba-Transversal 91, or Suba - Tv.91 by its abbreviation, is part of the TransMilenio mass-transit system of Bogotá, Colombia, which opened in the year 2000.

Location 

The station is located in northwestern Bogotá, specifically on Avenida Suba between Carreras 91 and 94C.

It is the nearest station to the center of the old village of Suba, which is now incorporated into the city of Bogotá.

It serves the Provenza, Suba-Centro, Java, and La Trinidad neighborhoods.

History 

In 2006, phase two of the TransMilenio system was completed, including the Avenida Suba line, on which this station is located.

The station is named Suba - Tv.91 due to its proximity to that intersection.

Station services

Main line service

Feeder routes 

This station does not have connections to feeder routes.

Inter-city service 

This station does not have inter-city service.

See also 
 Bogotá
 TransMilenio
 List of TransMilenio Stations

External links 
 TransMilenio

TransMilenio
Suba